Uxbridge is a rural locality in the local government area (LGA) of Derwent Valley in the South-east LGA region of Tasmania. The 2016 census recorded a population of 26 for the state suburb of Uxbridge.
It is a populated place in the West Coast subregion of Tasmania, with postal code 7140.

History 
Uxbridge was gazetted as a locality in 1976. It is believed to be named for a town in England. The name was first used for the parish, and by 1884 had been applied to the locality. A Post Office opened in 1887 and closed in 1966.

Geography
Most of the boundaries are survey lines or ridge lines. The Styx River forms a small part of the western boundary.

Road infrastructure
Route C610 (Uxbridge Road / Moogara Road) runs through the north-east corner.

References

Towns in Tasmania
Localities of Derwent Valley Council